Frans Wilhelm "Ville" Pörhölä (originally Horneman, 24 December 1897 – 28 November 1964) was a Finnish athlete who competed in shot put, discus throw, hammer throw and weight throw.

Pörhölä won the gold medal in shot put at the 1920 Summer Olympics. He also competed in discus throw finishing in eighth place and in weight throw in which he was ninth. He later concentrated on work leaving his sports career behind him. He re-emerged in the sports scene as a hammer thrower in 1929, and later became an Olympic silver medalist in 1932 and European champion in 1934. At his last Olympics in 1936 he finished 11th.

Nationally, Pörhölä won eight Finnish titles: in standing triple jump in 1922, in shot put in 1929–31 and in hammer throw in 1934–35. He also won the British AAA shot put title in 1922. His trademark was wearing a cap in competitions.

After retiring from competitions, Pörhölä worked for a large Finnish timber company, eventually becoming its managing director. He also served as president of the Sports Federation of Lapland in 1946–50.

Pörhölä originated from the island of Röyttä, near Tornio, and was known in Finland as Röyttän karhu ("The Bear from Röyttä").

References

1897 births
1964 deaths
People from Tornio
Finnish male discus throwers
Finnish male hammer throwers
Finnish male shot putters
Olympic athletes of Finland
Olympic gold medalists for Finland
Athletes (track and field) at the 1920 Summer Olympics
Athletes (track and field) at the 1924 Summer Olympics
Athletes (track and field) at the 1932 Summer Olympics
Athletes (track and field) at the 1936 Summer Olympics
European Athletics Championships medalists
Medalists at the 1932 Summer Olympics
Medalists at the 1920 Summer Olympics
Olympic silver medalists for Finland
Olympic gold medalists in athletics (track and field)
Olympic silver medalists in athletics (track and field)
Olympic weight throwers
Sportspeople from Lapland (Finland)